United States gubernatorial elections were held on November 7, 1978, in 36 states and two territories. The Republicans had a net gain of six seats, Democrats sustained a net loss of five seats, and there would be no governors of any other parties following these elections.

This was the first year in which Illinois held a gubernatorial election in a midterm election year since 1846. The state of Illinois moved its gubernatorial election date from presidential election years to midterm congressional election years. This election coincided with the Senate and the House elections.

Election results
A bolded state name features an article about the specific election.

States

Territories and federal district

See also
1978 United States elections
1978 United States Senate elections
1978 United States House of Representatives elections

Notes

 
November 1978 events in the United States